Stuart Webber (born 15 April 1984) is the Sporting Director of Norwich City. He was previously Head of Football Operations at Huddersfield Town.

Career
Webber's career in football started when he attended Northop College, Flintshire. As part of a work experience placement he got a job as part of the ground staff at Wrexham. At Wrexham he moved onto coaching the Academy, eventually becoming Head of Youth Development.

In July 2009, Webber left Wrexham to become Director of Recruitment at Liverpool working alongside managers like Rafa Benitez and Kenny Dalglish.

In August 2012, Webber left Liverpool to take up a position at Queens Park Rangers as Head of Scouting. before becoming Head of Recruitment in January 2013 at Wolverhampton Wanderers

Webber became Head of Football Operations at Huddersfield Town in June 2015, becoming instrumental in the recruitment of players that got Huddersfield promoted to the Premier League.

In April 2017, he became Sporting Director at Norwich City, and oversaw another promotion to the Premier League.

In May 2022, Stuart came under criticism for his role in the relegation of Norwich City from the Premier League at a protest outside of Carrow Road.<ref
name="Protest"></ref>

References

Living people
Norwich City F.C. non-playing staff
1984 births
Liverpool F.C. non-playing staff
Huddersfield Town A.F.C. non-playing staff
Wrexham A.F.C. non-playing staff
Wolverhampton Wanderers F.C. non-playing staff
Queens Park Rangers F.C. non-playing staff